Tapizar (May 6, 2008 – December 15, 2020) was an American Thoroughbred racehorse best known for his wins in the San Fernando Stakes and Breeders' Cup Dirt Mile.

Background 
Tapizar was a bay horse with a stripe on his head. His sire was Tapit, a champion sire who has sired four Belmont Stakes winners in Tonalist, Creator, Tapwrit, and Essential Quality as well as February Stakes winner Testa Matta. His dam was Winning Call, whose sire was Sovereign and Eclipse Award winner Deputy Minister.

Career

Two-year old season
As a two-year-old Tapizar ran four times. The first race was a maiden Special Weight at Monmouth Park. At the start he broke off well and settled in third, and by the half a mile pole he took the lead. He kept it until the home stretch, where he faded out of contention, finishing third. His next race was also at Monmouth Park. This time, he ran against future champions Pants on Fire, and Mucho Macho Man. At the start of the race, Tapizar stumbled badly, unseated the rider, and did not finish.

In his next start he went to Churchill Downs. At the start he broke decently, stalked in third, and stayed there almost all the way to the end. He faded to fourth at the very end of the race. He returned to Churchill Downs for his fourth and final start of the year. He started a length behind the leader Ratatat for most of the race, but eventually Ratatat tired, leaving Tapizar to romp as he was five lengths ahead of everyone else at the far turn. At the finish he finished by more the double at 10 1/2 lengths.

Three-year old season
With his destructive maiden win, his next race was his graded stakes debut, the Sham Stakes at Santa Anita. At the start he was third but moved to the front quickly. He then had the lead by two lengths for the next three quarters of a mile, where he opened up to win by four and a quarter lengths. In his next start Tapizar tried to make his second graded stakes win in the Robert B. Lewis Stakes. He took the lead early, like before, but he was forced to run fast early. He began to tire at the far turn and finished fifth. After the race he got a chipped knee and did not race for another eight months.

By October Tapizar had recovered completely and planned to return in an allowance. After a good start he took the lead by the first quarter, keeping the lead by just a length. Then at the far turn he opened up to win by two and a quarter lengths.  With that under his belt he finally had his chance to make his Grade 1 debut in the Breeders' Cup Dirt Mile. He started fifth and began to move up. He soon moved up to third, but it was all for nothing as he faded back to fifth at the finish.

Four-year old season
To start the four-year-old season, Tapizar did almost exactly the same thing he did to start his three-year-old season, by running in a graded stakes race at Santa Anita in January. At the start he pulled along four wide and took the lead by a quarter of a mile. After that, he kept the lead, regularly shrinking and increasing his lead until the final turn, where he was two lengths in front and at the wire was three and a half lengths ahead. After this, he ran in the G2 Charles H. Strub Stakes. This time he wasn't so lucky. He stalked in second for most of the race, slowly letting Ultimate Eagle open his lead. In the end Tapizar kept on fading until he finished fourth, 10 and three quarters behind.

A month later Tapizar tried another track when he went to Oaklawn Park for the Razorback Handicap. Similarly as in the Strub, he stalked closely behind the leader Alternation, and again he let Alternation open up his lead from half a length, to one and a half lengths at the finish. Tapizar was second from start to finish. After that, Tapizar did not race for another five months. He finally returned in the West Virginia Governor's Stakes. This time at the start he broke quickly and moved clear into the lead by the first quarter. He kept this lead until three quarters of mile in, where Seruni took over. This time, though, Tapizar regained it in the stretch and waltzed away by four and a half lengths.

The next race was his final prep before his biggest challenge yet, his second attempt at the Breeders' Cup Dirt Mile. At the start everything began to go wrong when he broke slowly and was bumped by Jersey Town and To Honor and Serve. After that he hustled to third, but quickly faded and finished in 6th place, 20 3/4 lengths behind. Then came his last race, the Breeders' Cup Dirt Mile. He had two big challengers, named Fed Biz, and Shackleford. At the start Shackleford stumbled and was not a big factor. Fed Biz was hustled early and completely tired. Meanwhile, Tapizar stalked in second behind Emcee, then took over at three quarters of a mile, and won by two and a quarter lengths.

Retirement and death

Tapizar was retired to stud in 2013, producing a couple noteworthy horses. His most noteworthy progeny is 2018 Kentucky Oaks winner and Horse of the Year finalist Monomoy Girl.

Tapizar was euthanized on December 15, 2020 at the age of 12 following an accident in his stall. He had been scheduled to ship to Japan in mid-January 2021 to stand at stud at Yushun Stallion Station.

References

 
 
 http://gainesway.com/stallions/tapizar/

Breeders' Cup Dirt Mile winners
2008 racehorse births
2020 racehorse deaths
Thoroughbred family 8-d
Racehorses trained in the United States
Racehorses bred in Kentucky